PS Thames was a passenger vessel built for the London and North Western Railway in 1868.

History

PS Thames was built by Bowdler, Chaffer and Company, Liverpool and launched in 1868. She was used for services on the River Mersey.

In 1879 she was acquired by the Great Western Railway where she was used as a tender at Plymouth.

In 1882 she was acquired by the London, Tilbury and Southend Railway. In 1912 she was then owned by the Midland Railway and withdrawn in 1913.

References

1868 ships
Passenger ships of the United Kingdom
Steamships of the United Kingdom
Ships built on the River Tyne
Ships of the London and North Western Railway
Ships of the Great Western Railway
Ships of the London, Tilbury and Southend Railway
Ships of the Midland Railway
Paddle steamers of the United Kingdom